Contact stomatitis is inflammation or pain of the oral mucosa caused by external stimuli. It is characterized by cutaneous lesions that may be located where the offending agent contacts the mucosa for a prolonged time. Oftentimes it presents in the mouth after contact with hot food or from ill-fitted dentures or other irritant. Consequently, patients may seek resolve from their dentist rather than a dermatologist. Unlike with allergic contact stomatitis, the skin requires no previous exposure to a stimulant before crafting an immune reaction.

See also 
 Contact urticaria
 List of cutaneous conditions

References 

Contact dermatitis